William Todd may refer to:

Bill Todd (William Laurence Todd), NASA program manager and aquanaut
Billy Todd (1929–2008), singer
Will Todd (born 1970), English composer and pianist
William E. Todd (born 1962), United States ambassador to Cambodia
William Frederick Todd (1854–1935), Canadian politician
William Gowan Todd (1820–1877), Catholic priest, author, and humanitarian
William H. Todd (1864–1932), American shipbuilder
William L. Todd (1818–1876), creator of the flag of California
William Todd (businessman) (1803–1873), American businessman, Canadian senate nominee
William Todd (soldier) (1739–1810), American soldier and politician

See also
William Todd-Jones, British puppet designer, performer, director, and writer